Khalil bin Yahaya is a Malaysian politician who served as Deputy Speaker of the Perak State Legislative Assembly from May 2020 to his removal from the position in December 2022. He has served as Member of the Perak State Legislative Assembly (MLA) for Kubu Gajah since May 2018. He is a member of the Malaysian Islamic Party (PAS), a component party of the Perikatan Nasional (PN) coalition.

Election Results

References

Living people
People from Perak
Malaysian people of Malay descent
Malaysian Muslims
Malaysian Islamic Party politicians
Members of the Perak State Legislative Assembly
21st-century Malaysian politicians
Year of birth missing (living people)